The Hyacinth Chen School of Nursing was officially opened on August 10, 2008, on a location directly across from the Northern Caribbean University campus across from NCU's Dental Centre located in Mandeville, Jamaica.

The school is owned by the Seventh-day Adventist Church in Jamaica. The school is being named in honour of Mrs. Hyacinth Chen, the mother of major donor, Michael Lee-Chin, Jamaican/Canadian businessman.

The school will hold 800 nursing students and will reduce Jamaica's nursing shortage.

It is a part of the Seventh-day Adventist education system, the world's second largest Christian school system.

See also

 List of Seventh-day Adventist colleges and universities
 Seventh-day Adventist education
 Seventh-day Adventist Church
 Seventh-day Adventist theology
 History of the Seventh-day Adventist Church
Adventist Colleges and Universities
List of Seventh-day Adventist hospitals
List of Seventh-day Adventist medical schools
List of Seventh-day Adventist secondary schools
Christian school

References

External links 
 Northern Caribbean University official website

Colleges in Jamaica
Educational institutions established in 2008
Seventh-day Adventist education
Buildings and structures in Manchester Parish
2008 establishments in Jamaica